Wills Act is a stock short title used in Australia, Malaysia, New Zealand, South Africa, and the United Kingdom for legislation relating to wills.

List

Australia
 Wills, Probate and Administration Act 1898
 Wills Act 1997 (Vic)
 Wills Act 1936 (SA)
 Wills Act 2008 (Tas)

Malaysia
 Wills Act 1959

New Zealand
 Wills Act 2007

South Africa
 Wills Act 7 of 1953

United Kingdom
 Statute of Wills 1540 (32 Hen 8 c 1)
 Statute of Wills 1542 (34 & 35 Hen 8 c 5)
 Wills Act 1751 (25 Geo 2 c 6)
 Wills Act 1837 (7 Will 4 & 1 Vict c 26)
 Wills Act Amendment Act 1852 (15 & 16 Vict c 24)
 Wills Act 1861 or Lord Kingsdown's Act (24 & 25 Vict c 114)
 Wills (Soldiers and Sailors) Act 1918 (8 & 9 Geo 5 c 58)
 Wills Act 1963 (c 44)
 Wills Act 1968 (c 28)

See also
List of short titles

Lists of legislation by short title